Dandagaun  is a small village located northern part of Mahalaxmi Municipality at Dhankuta district in the Province no. 1 of eastern Nepal. At the time of the 1991 Nepal census it had a population of 1838 people living in 924 individual households. But latest survey which hold by village it has more than 2500 population.

References

Populated places in Dhankuta District